Mark (?-September 18, 1755) (sometimes called Mark Codman) was a black slave owned by Captain John Codman (1696-1755) of Massachusetts in Charlestown, Boston 20 years before the American Revolutionary War. Though some texts refer to Mark as "Mark Codman", he was probably not referred to as such during his life as giving a slave the surname of his master was not commonly done with New England slaves. The contemporary documents from the investigation and trial only use Mark for his name.

Mark was a slave to Codman for a few years before his execution. He was accused of burning down a building about six years before his death to try to gain freedom. Mark could read, and said that he read the Bible to find a way to kill his master without committing a sin. He struck upon poisoning because it did not involve the shedding of blood. According to historical documents from the investigation and judgement, Mark obtained arsenic from a doctor on the pretense it was to kill pigs, but furnished it to his sister who administered it to Codman. Several other slaves were also implicated in the plot.

In 1755, Mark was convicted of assisting in the successful poisoning of his master, John Codman. As punishment, Mark was hanged, tarred, and his body displayed in an iron gibbet for several years after his death at a well-known spot (at the time) in present-day Somerville, Massachusetts. Mark's sister Phillis was tried for the actual act of poisoning; she was convicted and burned alive.

Mark's publicly displayed body was a local landmark. In 1775, twenty years after Mark's execution, Paul Revere came to the same spot in his ride to warn American colonial forces of the movements of the British Army. Revere's 1798 written account noted that "nearly opposite where Mark was hung in chains, I saw two men on Horse back, under a Tree. When I got near them, I discovered they were British officers", whom Revere successfully evaded.

See also
History of slavery in Massachusetts

References

1755 deaths
Year of birth unknown
18th-century American slaves
1755 in Massachusetts
African-American history in Boston
Place of birth missing
18th-century executions of American people
Executed African-American people
Poisoners
Somerville, Massachusetts
People executed by the Thirteen Colonies by hanging
People executed by Massachusetts by hanging
People of colonial Massachusetts